The 1930 College Football All-Southern Team consists of American football players selected to the College Football All-Southern Teams selected by various organizations for the 1930 Southern Conference football season. Alabama won the Southern and national championship.

Composite eleven
The All-Southern eleven compiled by the Associated Press included:
Jerry Dalrymple, end for Tulane, elected to the College Football Hall of Fame in 1954.
Bobby Dodd, quarterback for Tennessee, later coached Georgia Tech to a national title, inducted into the College Football Hall of Fame in 1993. 
Milton Leathers, guard for Georgia
Vance Maree, tackle for Georgia Tech. One writer said Maree and Frank Speer had the reputation as "the toughest pair of tackles in the south."
Buddy Hackman, halfback for Tennessee. Hackman filled the role of Gene McEver, who missed the entire season with torn ligaments in his knee. He was inducted into the Tennessee Sports Hall of Fame in 1974.
Jack Roberts, fullback for Georgia. Known as "The Ripper", he later played in the National Football League.
Loyd Roberts, center and captain for Tulane.
Fred Sington, tackle for Alabama. He was inducted into the College Football Hall of Fame in 1955. Sington was chosen for an Associated Press Southeast Area All-Time football team 1920–1969 era.
Vernon "Catfish" Smith, end for Georgia, made an all-time Georgia Bulldogs football team picked in 1935. 
Jimmy Steele, guard for Florida.
John Suther, halfback for Alabama. Suther described the feeling before the Tennessee game, which Alabama won 18–6. "Coach Wade was boiling mad. He was like a blood-thirsty drill sergeant anyway, and those critics made him more fiery ... He challenged us to help him shut up the loudmouths that were making his life miserable."

All-Southerns of 1930

Ends
Jerry Dalrymple, Tulane (College Football Hall of Fame) (AP-1, UP-1, DT-1)
Vernon "Catfish" Smith, Georgia (College Football Hall of Fame) (AP-1, UP-2, DT-2)
Herb Maffett, Georgia (AP-2, UP-1, DT-1)
Bill Schwartz, Vanderbilt (AP-2, UP-2, DT-2)

Tackles
Fred Sington*, Alabama (College Football Hall of Fame) (AP-1, UP-1, DT-1)
Vance Maree, Georgia Tech (AP-1, UP-2, DT-2)
Foots Clement, Alabama (AP-2, UP-1, DT-1)
Dale Waters, Florida (AP-2, UP-2, DT-2)

Guards
Jimmy Steele, Florida (AP-1, UP-1, DT-2)
Milton Leathers, Georgia (AP-1, UP-1, DT-1)
Ralph Maddox, Georgia (AP-2)
Maury Bodenger, Tulane (AP-2, DT-2)
Harry Thayer, Tennessee (UP-2)
L. G. "Floppy" Forquer, Kentucky (UP-2, DT-1)

Centers
Loyd Roberts, Tulane (AP-1, UP-1, DT-2)
Ned Lipscomb, North Carolina (AP-2, UP-2, DT-1)

Quarterbacks
Bobby Dodd†, Tennessee (College Football Hall of Fame) (AP-1, UP-1, DT-1)
Austin Downes, Georgia (AP-2, UP-2, DT-2)

Halfbacks
John Suther, Alabama (AP-1, UP-1, DT-1)
Buddy Hackman, Tennessee (AP-1, UP-1, DT-1)
Shipwreck Kelly, Kentucky (AP-2)
Don Zimmerman, Tulane (AP-2, UP-2)
Red Bethea, Florida (UP-2, DT-2)
Bill Murray, Duke (College Football Hall of Fame) (DT-2)

Fullbacks
Jack Roberts, Georgia (AP-1, UP-1, DT-1)
John Lewis Cain, Alabama (College Football Hall of Fame) (AP-2, UP-2, DT-2)

Key

See also
1930 College Football All-America Team

References

1930 Southern Conference football season
College Football All-Southern Teams